The War Labor Policies Board (WLPB) (1918-1919) was a temporary agency of the United States Government to support American military actions during the end of World War I; future president Franklin Delano Roosevelt was a member.

History

Following the United States declaration of war on Germany in early April 1917, the U.S. "War Labor Administrator" (Secretary of Labor) William Bauchop Wilson established the War Labor Policies Board (WLPB) on May 13, 1918.

According to the Bureau of Industrial Labor, "It was the purpose of this Board to consider and to formulate labor policies affecting the production of war industries, both those directly under Government control and those industry controlled through the contract-letting power, etc...  The National War Labor Board was a court of appeal where principles of the Labor Administration were involved in dispute".  An early act was to adopt principles and policies of the National War Labor Board.  Frankfurter also had a seat on the War Industries Board.

The board formulated unified policies regarding labor administration during World War I.  It also promoted improved housing for workers during World War I. After the Armistice of 11 November 1918, the board reviewed how to cancel government contracts and demobilization.  It also studied wartime labor conditions at home and abroad, plus US postwar labor policies. Despite numerous recommendations from a member, Mary van Kleeck, who headed the Women in Industry Service group, the Board did not take action to address wage disparities between male and female workers during World War I.

The board had only one labor case referred to it by the National War Labor Board.

The board ended in March 1919.

Organization

Departmental members

The following departments and organizations had representatives on the board.:

Board committees

Committees of the board included:

Board members

The following people served as executives of the board.  Hasse came to the board through Walter Weyl, who wrote on her behalf to Max Lowenthal.:

At the time, Frankfurter was serving as Assistant to the Secretary of Labor.

Legacy

In the immediate aftermath of WWI, the Bureau of Industrial Research assessed the War Labor Policies Board as follows:  Secretary of Labor Wilson was appointed by the President to act as War Labor Administrator, a power which he subsequently exercised in large measure through Mr. Frankfurter...  Thus Mr. Wilson combined in himself a dual authority... ... While created as a division of the Department of Labor, with a seat in the Labor Cabinet, this Board had virtually become the leglislative body of the National War Labor Administration and may thus be treated independently...    Among other things, the WLPB cemented a friendship between Roosevelt and Frankfurter, who had already met in 1906 and had continued to meet occasionally at the Harvard Club.

Lowenthal lived with Frankfurter in Washington, DC, at that time.

The United States National Archives and Records Administration houses the records of the WLPB.

These records have "the distinction of being Record Group 1 because its records were the first records received by the National Archives in the mid-1930s. The records measure a mere 12 cubic feet, and there are only 7 record series."

See also

 National War Labor Board (1918–1919)
 Timeline of labor issues and events
 American entry into World War I
 United States home front during World War I
 Food and Fuel Control Act
 Victory garden
 Liberty bond
 United States in World War I

References

External sources

 Library of Congress:  Felix Frankfurter papers, 1846-1966

Government agencies established in 1918
1918 establishments in the United States
1919 disestablishments in the United States
Labor relations boards
Defunct independent agencies of the United States government
History of labor relations in the United States
Agencies of the United States government during World War I